The European Political Community (EPC) is an intergovernmental forum for political and strategic discussions about the future of Europe, established in 2022 after the Russian invasion of Ukraine. The group first met in October 2022 in Prague, with participants from 44 European countries, as well as the Presidents of the European Council and the European Commission.

History  
The European Political Community was proposed by the French president Emmanuel Macron at the Conference on the Future of Europe on 9 May 2022 after the Russian invasion of Ukraine, in his role as the president of the Council of the European Union (EU). The President of the European Council, Charles Michel, also put forward a similar proposal for the establishment of a "European geopolitical community". On 23–24 June 2022, formation of the community was agreed to at a meeting of the European Council. On 29 September 2022, the United Kingdom announced that it would participate in the community. The group convened for the first time on 6 October 2022 with leaders from 44 states in attendance. Russia and Belarus were deliberately excluded from participation. In January 2023, it was confirmed that San Marino had joined the community becoming its 45th participating state. It has been reported that the heads of government of Andorra and Monaco will also attend the second summit bringing the number of members up to 47.

Aim
The aim of the European Political Community is to provide a policy coordination platform for European countries across the continent and to foster political dialogue and cooperation in order to address issues of common interest, so as to strengthen the security, stability and prosperity of the European continent, in particular in regard to the European energy crisis.

The European Political Community aims at:

strengthening the links between EU member states and Non-EU member states who share the same European values,
increasing cooperation between the member countries on a large scale of topics such as peace, security, energy, climate, migration and the current economic situation,
allowing candidate states to start taking part in some European projects, such as student and university exchanges.

Following a bilateral summit meeting between the leaders of the United Kingdom and France on 10 March 2023, it was stated in the joint declaration that the EPC should focus on energy, infrastructures, connectivity, cybersecurity, countering disinformation and migration.

Structure
The European Political Community is envisaged as an intergovernmental forum for heads of states and governments similar to the G7 or G20 and upon establishment did not have its own secretariat, budget or staff. Each summit is primarily organised by the hosting country. 

In January 2023, the Government of France began recruiting a small task force, led by a project manager, to support the work of the EPC. The task force will help coordinate the preparation and organisation of EPC Summits, support the institutional development of the EPC, facilitate the insertion of the EPC in the space European diplomacy (EU, Council of Europe) and contribute to mobilising various other actors (such as development banks) in support of the work of the EPC. The task force is to be based in Paris with a presence in the host city for the next summit.

The invitation letter for the first summit was signed by European Council President Charles Michel. For the second summit, invitation letters were jointly signed by Charles Michel and Maia Sandu, the president of the hosting country. 

As the community has not yet launched an official website, the agendas, press releases and multimedia resources for the first summit were published on the website of the European Council.

Symbols
At the request of the government of the United Kingdom, the European Political Community does not use symbols associated with the European Union such as the European Flag or the European Anthem. Instead, a simple wordmark consisting of the English language name of the community in blue capital letters on a white background was displayed on printed materials, backdrops, and lecterns during the first summit.

Summits 

Two summits are planned to be held every year with the spring summit being hosted by a non-EU member state and the autumn summit hosted by the state holding the Presidency of the Council of the European Union at that particular time. The first summit took place in Prague on 6 October 2022. The event was covered live by the Eurovision network.

Following the first summit, it was decided that Moldova will hold the next meeting, and topics on which leaders agreed to work on include protecting "key facilities" such as pipelines, undersea cables, and satellites.

Participants 
In addition to EU member states, the EPC also includes countries such as Armenia, Azerbaijan, Georgia, Iceland, Liechtenstein, Moldova, Norway, San Marino, Switzerland, Turkey, Ukraine and the United Kingdom.

The countries and international organisations participating in the European Political Community are as follows:

Countries participating

 
 
 
 
 
 
 
 
 
 
 
 
 
 
 
 
 
 
 
 
 
 
 
 
 
 
 
 
 
 
 
 
 
 
 
 
 
 
 
 
 
 
 
 
 
 
 

Organisations participating

  ∟ European Council ∟ European Commission

 European countries not participating

 

 European countries not invited

Achievements
During the first summit, it was agreed that a European Union led mission would be deployed on the Armenian side of the border with Azerbaijan for a period of two months of monitoring following the Armenia–Azerbaijan border crisis. This mission ultimately led to the deployment of a longer term European Union Mission in Armenia.

The first summit also led to a rapprochement between the United Kingdom and European institutions. At the first summit the UK agreed to re-engage with the North Seas Energy Cooperation (NSEC) and committed to joining the Permanent Structured Cooperation (PESCO) and its Military Mobility programme.

Reaction

German Chancellor, Olaf Scholz said that community could mediate "regular exchanges at the political level" once or twice a year to discuss issues affecting the continent. Prime Minister of Albania, Edi Rama, and Prime Minister of the Netherlands, Mark Rutte, supported Macron's proposal in an opinion piece published by Politico on 5 October 2022. They argued that Europe needed a platform that did not overlap with existing regional organizations or displace processes of European Union membership. In a command paper presented to parliament in March 2023, the UK government stated that it supports the aims of the EPC and sees it as a "notable and welcome new forum for continent-wide cooperation".

According to the Associated Press, critics claimed the EPC is an attempt to put the brakes on the potential enlargement of the European Union. "Others fear it may become a talking shop, perhaps convening once or twice a year but devoid of any real clout or content" and that "No EU money or programs are on offer, and no formal declaration will be issued after the summit. The proof of its success is likely to be whether a second meeting ever actually takes place. "The creation of this new forum reportedly "perplexed" the Council of Europe, with a spokesperson stating "In the field of human rights, democracy and the rule of law, such a pan-European community already exists: it is the Council of Europe."

See also 

 Council of Europe
 European integration
 Organization for Security and Co-operation in Europe
 Pan-European identity
 Politics of Europe

Notes

References

External links 
 Czech Presidency of the Council of the European Union - European Political Community
 Meeting of the European Political Community, 6 October 2022
  Department of European and Foreign Affairs, Government of France - European Political Community (in French)
 European Political Community News on Twitter

European Political Community
Diplomatic conferences
2022 conferences
Foreign relations of the European Union
October 2022 events in the Czech Republic
2022 establishments in the Czech Republic
European integration
European Political Community
Pan-European organizations